Jaroslav Török (born 1 December 1971) is a Slovak ice hockey player. He competed in the men's tournament at the 2002 Winter Olympics.

Career statistics

Regular season and playoffs

International

References

External links

1971 births
Living people
Olympic ice hockey players of Slovakia
Ice hockey players at the 2002 Winter Olympics
Sportspeople from Martin, Slovakia
HK Dukla Trenčín players
HC Košice players
MHC Martin players
HK Nitra players
HC Tábor players
MsHK Žilina players
HKM Zvolen players
Slovak expatriate ice hockey players in the Czech Republic
Slovak ice hockey left wingers
Czechoslovak ice hockey left wingers